Thanmanpillai Kanagasabai is a Sri Lankan Tamil politician and former Member of Parliament.

In 2004 Kanagasabai was selected by the Tamil Tigers as a Tamil National Alliance (TNA) parliamentary candidate. Kanagasabai represented the Batticaloa multi-member electoral district for the TNA in the Sri Lankan Parliament between April 2004 and February 2010.

Kanagasabai declined re-nomination for the 2010 parliamentary election.

References

Sri Lankan Tamil politicians
1939 births
Living people
Members of the 13th Parliament of Sri Lanka
Tamil National Alliance politicians